The 1932 United States presidential election in Wyoming took place on November 8, 1932, as part of the 1932 United States presidential election. State voters chose three representatives, or electors, to the Electoral College, who voted for president and vice president.

Wyoming was won by the Democratic nominee, the 44nd Governor of New York, Franklin D. Roosevelt, running with John Nance Garner, the 39th Speaker of the United States House of Representatives, with 56.07 percent of the popular vote, against the incumbent Republican President Herbert Hoover and Vice President Charles Curtis, with 40.82 percent of the popular vote, a 15.3% margin of victory. , this is the last election in which Johnson County and Crook County have voted for a Democratic presidential candidate, despite the fact that Roosevelt would win statewide by a larger margin 4 years later, in 1936.

Despite the fact that Hoover had easily carried Wyoming by over 28 points in 1928, Roosevelt easily flipped the state, although his 15.3% margin of victory was slightly less than his national popular vote margin of 17.8%; thus Wyoming voted 2.5% to the right of the nation in this election. Roosevelt flipped 21 counties Hoover won in 1928, being Albany, Campbell, Carbon, Converse, Crook, Fremont, Goshen, Hot Springs, Johnson, Laramie, Lincoln, Natrona, Niobrara, Park, Platte, Sheridan, Sublette, Teton, Uinta, Washakie, and Weston. Whereas in 1928 Hoover won all 23 of Wyoming's counties with the exception of the heavily unionized Sweetwater, this election would see the reverse, with Roosevelt carrying every county except for Big Horn, which he narrowly lost by 3.9%. Whereas Al Smith only carried Sweetwater by 8%, Roosevelt tripled his victory to a landslide margin of 37%, a leftward swing of 29%. Hoover's performance in the county was the worst for a Republican up until that time, while his statewide vote total was the worst for a Republican since 1912, although due to a strong third party performance by Theodore Roosevelt, a distant cousin of Franklin, Republican William Taft only lost by 2%.

Though the previous decade had been a fiercely Republican age in American politics, with the beginning of the Great Depression in 1929, voters blamed Republicans for the economic downturn, especially President Herbert Hoover, whom they viewed as not doing enough to alleviate their struggles while siding with big business. Roosevelt promised to enact a serious of legislative proposals, collectively called The New Deal, to end the Great Depression. Roosevelt campaigned cautiously, trying to minimize gaffes while keeping the attention on his opponent, who was so unpopular that wherever he went, he often had items thrown at him, and was publicly opposed by numerous prominent Republicans such as Senators Bronson Cutting and Henry Wallace. Though both campaigns spent heavily on radio, Roosevelt employed it more effectively, using it to craft a persona that voters believed cared about them, while also hiding his paralysis due to Polio. 

Roosevelt's victory was the beginning of a major realignment in American politics, with him beginning the "New Deal" coalition, a coalition that would favor the Democratic Party in elections up until it's demise in the 1970s. During this period, though Republicans controlled the presidency more, Democrats maintained a firm grip on Congress, controlling both chambers with the exceptions of 1947-49 and 1951-53, all the way up until Republicans regained control of the Senate in the Reagan Revolution in 1980. Roosevelt's liberal big government policies remains a large part of the Democratic Party's platform in the modern era, with many of the programs he enacted, such as Social Security remaining in effect and popular with voters, so much so to the point where most politicians avoid mentioning changing it at all.

Results

Results by county

See also
 United States presidential elections in Wyoming

References

Wyoming
1932
1932 Wyoming elections